Fourteen Men : Verses (1954) is a collection of poetry by Australian poet Mary Gilmore. It won the ALS Gold Medal in 1954.

The collection consists of 82 poems which were all published for the first time in this volume.

The title poem makes reference to the massacre of Chinese during the Lambing Flat riots of 1860–61.

Contents

Reviews

"J. E.", a reviewer in The Cairns Post was quite enthusiastic about the collection. "Despite her 89 years, Dame Mary shows a remarkable talent for continuing to write poems of such depth and perspective that they could easily have been written by a person 60 years her junior. She writes not of the past (which she could well do remembering her colourful career) but of modern aspects of this disenchanted age — aeroplanes radar and atom bombs." The reviewer then went on to compare Gilmore with Byron, Shelley and Browning.

A. D. Hope was rather more analytical in his review in The Sydney Morning Herald: "Apart from the patriotic and the war poems, Fourteen Men seems to me in some ways Mary Gilmore's best. There are better poems in the volume of selected verse published in 1948, but in this volume there is concentration, a distillation, and clarification of the essence, less of the trivial and occasional, and a plain note of vision which is, perhaps, the effect of the clairvoyance that comes from looking back on things long done with but not abandoned, loved but no longer possessed. It is this sense of clairvoyance which is the strongest impression the book leaves, as her mind moves back in quest and excitement over the events and people of her youth, the sights and creatures of the country in New South Wales and the lives of the aborigines whom she knew as a child."

Awards and nominations 
 1954 — winner ALS Gold Medal

References

1954 poetry books
Australian poetry collections
ALS Gold Medal winning works
Angus & Robertson books